The Impending Crisis of the South: How to Meet It is an 1857 book by Hinton Rowan Helper, who declares himself a proud Southerner. It was written mostly in Baltimore, but it would have been illegal to publish it there, as he pointed out. It was a strong attack on slavery as inefficient and a barrier to the economic advancement of whites. The book was widely distributed by Horace Greeley and other antislavery leaders, and infuriated Southerners. According to historian George M. Fredrickson, "it would not be difficult to make a case for The Impending Crisis as the most important single book, in terms of its political impact, that has ever been published in the United States."  In the North it became "THE book against slavery." A book reviewer wrote, "Next to Uncle Tom's Cabin (1852), Hinton Helper's critique of slavery and the Southern class system, The Impending Crisis of the South (1857), was arguably the most important antislavery book of the 1850s."

Condemnation of slavery

The book condemned slavery, but "not with reference, except in a very slight degree, to its humanitarian or religious aspects," which had already been dealt with at length by Northern writers. Instead, Helper criticized slavery on economic grounds, appealing to whites' rational self-interest, rather than "any special friendliness or sympathy for the blacks." Helper claimed that slavery hurt the Southern economy by preventing economic development and industrialization, and that it was the main reason why the South had fallen far behind the North, both economically and demographically. Helper tried to speak on behalf of the majority of Southern whites, poor or of moderate means — the plain folk of the Old South — whom he claimed were oppressed by a small aristocracy of wealthy slave owners.

Helper's tone was aggressive: "Freesoilers and abolitionists are the only true friends of the South; slaveholders and slave-breeders are downright enemies of their own section. Anti-slavery men are working for the Union and for the good of the whole world; proslavery men are working for the disunion of the States, and for the good of nothing except themselves."

The poverty of the slaveholding South
According to a published summary of the book, the South, under slavery, is not doing well economically. Massachusetts produces sixteen bushels of wheat to the acre, while Virginia produces only seven. Iowa produces thirty-six bushels of oats to the acre; Mississippi produces only twelve. In 1790, at the time of the first census, the population of New York was 340,000 and that of Virginia 748,000; in 1850 the population of New York was 3,097,000, while that of Virginia was 1,421,000. Land in the North sells for much more than land in the South. These are only a few examples of the many statistics of this sort in the book. Many draw on the U.S. Census, or other "confessedly authentic, and for the most part official, sources of information."

Political impact
A version of it was published in German translation in 1860.

With the approach of the 1860 presidential election, to help the Republican Party a Compendium version appeared in July 1859; it was an abridgement that kept the statistics but watered down some of the confrontational rhetoric. It was endorsed by 68 Republican members of Congress. By December 1859, 500 copies a day were being sold.

This version met with fierce opposition. Possession of a copy was treated as criminal offense in most of the South. Distributors of the book were arrested, and three men in Arkansas were hanged for possession of it.

Congress convened on December 5, 1859. The House of Representatives was unable to conduct any business until February 1, 1860, because the body was so divided that it was unable to elect a speaker. Helper's book was the only topic. During the "ill-spirited and acrimoneous" election campaign, Southerners refused to accept anyone who had helped Helper. It is the second-longest such dispute in House history. Another source says it was the longest dispute, with 44 elections for speaker.

In rebuttal, Louis F. Schade published in 1860 A Book for the "Impending Crisis!" Appeal to the Common Sense and Patriotism of the People of the United States. "Helperism" Annihilated! The "Irrepressible Conflict" and Its Consequences! (80 pages).

Rowan's racism
Although it was mostly ignored by the abolitionists, Helper was a rabid white supremacist. His goal in writing the book, as he says, was to help Southern whites, not Blacks. According to him, Blacks were inferior to whites, and there was no place for them in the United States; after emancipation, they should be removed from the country, he said. "A. B. Burdick, the publisher of The Impending Crisis, testified that Helper ... avoided all contacts with Negroes, refusing even to patronize hotels or restaurants which employed Negroes in menial capacities. Another man who knew Helper before the war recalled that 'he has always been inflexibly opposed to all the relations and conditions which have kept the two races close together; and this ... was one of the principal grounds of his opposition to slavery."

References

Further reading
 
 
Bailey, Hugh C. (1965). Hinton Rowan Helper: Abolitionist-Racist. Tuscaloosa, Alabama: University of Alabama Press. Review, pp. 410-411
Brown, David (2006). Southern Outcast: Hinton Rowan Helper and the Impending Crisis of the South. Baton Rouge: Louisiana State University Press. Review

External links
1857 text of  The Impending Crisis at the University of North Carolina
 Compendium of the Impending Crisis of the South (1859 version online)

1857 non-fiction books
Non-fiction books about American slavery
Abolitionism in the United States
American Civil War books
Origins of the American Civil War
Censored books